The fourth and final season of The O.C., an American teen drama television series, aired in the United States from November 2, 2006, to February 22, 2007, and consisted of 16 episodes. The O.Cs final season aired Thursdays at 9:00 p.m. ET in the United States on Fox, a terrestrial television network. Fox tested a new timeslot by airing the second episode on Wednesday at 9:00 p.m. ET against ABC's Lost and CBS's Criminal Minds. With Lost about to enter a three-month hiatus, Fox hoped that changing the timeslot for The O.C. would attract back viewers it had lost since the end of the previous season; however, the move was unsuccessful and the show returned to its Thursday timeslot.

The season was released on DVD as a five-disc boxed set under the title The O.C.: The Complete Fourth Season on May 22, 2007, by Warner Bros. Home Video. The season was also made available in the American versions of Zune and iTunes Store. Before the season premiered on television, it was available through on demand streaming. In the US, streaming was available from October 26, 2006, at 3:01 a.m. ET onwards, through Fox Interactive Media's MySpace and MyFoxLocal stations.

In Canada, the fourth season was simulcast on the terrestrial CTV Television Network. Additionally, as a result of an agreement between Warner Bros. and CTV, the first episode was available to be streamed from October 30, 2006, at 12:00 p.m. ET onwards, through the CTV Broadband Network. In the United Kingdom the season premiered on January 9, 2007, on E4, and in Australia it was broadcast by Network Ten on November 7, 2006, at 8:30 p.m. (local time).

Synopsis 
Life after high school hasn't been great for the graduates of Harbor high. Ryan, Julie, and Summer have trouble adjusting to life without Marissa. Taylor ran into some trouble. Back in Newport for her Junior year, Kaitlin begins to act out. Sandy and Kirsten face another bombshell life puts in their lap or oven. Seth tries to find his calling. Ryan gets an unexpected visitor who helps Julie out of her grief.

Cast and characters

Regular
 Peter Gallagher as Sandy Cohen (16 episodes)
 Kelly Rowan as Kirsten Cohen (16 episodes)
 Benjamin McKenzie as Ryan Atwood (16 episodes)
 Adam Brody as Seth Cohen (16 episodes)
 Melinda Clarke as Julie Cooper (16 episodes)
 Rachel Bilson as Summer Roberts (16 episodes)
 Autumn Reeser as  Taylor Townsend (16 episodes)
 Willa Holland as Kaitlin Cooper (16 episodes)

Recurring
 Wayne Dalglish as Brad Ward (10 episodes)
 Corey Price as Eric Ward (10 episodes)
 Chris Pratt as Che (9 episodes)
 Kevin Sorbo as Frank Atwood (7 episodes)
 Gary Grubbs as Gordan Bullit (6 episodes)
 Brandon Quinn as Spencer Bullit (6 episodes)
 Scott Krinsky as Darryl (5 episodes)
 Michael Nouri as Neil Roberts (3 episodes)

Special Guest starring
 Chris Brown as Will Tutt (3 episodes)
 Tate Donovan as Jimmy Cooper (1 episode)

Episodes

Notes 
 - The second episode was shown first in Canada on Tuesday, November 7 at 8:00 p.m. ET on CTV. In the United States the episode aired the next day at 9:00 p.m. ET.

Crew
The season was produced by Warner Bros. Television, College Hill Pictures and Wonderland Sound and Vision. The executive producers were Bob DeLaurentis, creator Josh Schwartz and Wonderland co-founders McG and Stephanie Savage. Ian Toynton and John Stephens served as co-executive producers. The staff writers were Schwartz, Savage, Stephens, J.J. Philbin, Leila Gerstein and Mark Fish. The regular directors throughout the season were Toynton, Michael Lange, Norman Buckley and Patrick Norris.

Cast

The fourth season had star billing for eight major roles. Rachel Bilson as Summer, Adam Brody as Seth, Melinda Clarke as Julie, Peter Gallagher as Sandy, Benjamin McKenzie as Ryan, and Kelly Rowan as Kirsten all returned to the main cast. Former main cast member Mischa Barton did not return because her character, Marissa, died in the third season finale. Autumn Reeser as recent high school graduate Taylor Townsend, and Willa Holland as Marissa's younger sister Kaitlin both joined the main cast, having previously held recurring roles. Other cast members returning in recurring roles include Cam Gigandet as Volchok, Erin Foster as Heather, Michael Nouri as Summer's father Dr. Neil Roberts, Paula Trickey as Taylor's mother Veronica, and Ashley Hartman who starred as Holly Fischer in the first season. Additionally former main cast member Tate Donovan returned as Jimmy Cooper in a non-canonical appearance.

Actors who left the cast include Ryan Donowho (Johnny), Jeri Ryan (Charlotte), Shaun Duke (Henry Griffin), Kayla Ewell (Casey), and Nikki Reed (Sadie). New members who joined the cast include Kevin Sorbo as Ryan's father Frank; Gary Grubbs as an oil merchant who calls himself The Bullit; Brandon Quinn as Bullit's son Spencer; Chris Pratt as an environmental activist nicknamed Che; and Wayne Dalglish and Corey Price as Luke Ward's younger twin brothers Brad and Eric. New guest stars who joined in recurring roles include Tia Carrere as Dean Torres, singer Chris Brown as lonely band geek Will Tutt, Henri Lubatti as Taylor's ex-husband Henri-Michel de Momourant, and Steve-O in a cameo role as an unnamed marine.

Reception
While ratings were lower than those of the third season, the final season is generally regarded by fans and critics as an improvement on the third. Variety'''s Josef Adalian said that "[the show] is once again in great creative shape". He added that "the scripts are snappy, the plots make sense, the acting's solid, [and] the music is appropriately indie" but criticized Fox for "throwing away" the show by giving it the Thursday 9:00 p.m. timeslot. The difficult timeslot Adalian was referring to was against two other very popular shows, CSI and Grey's Anatomy. With a later start to the season in November the premiere attracted 3.4 million viewers,
which was a series low and marked a 55 percent decrease in the 18–49 demographic, from the third season premiere. The first half of the season averaged 4.06 million viewers, with the season as a whole averaging 4.6 million viewers. This increase was mostly due to 6.7 million viewers, 76 percent more than the season average, tuning in to see the final ever installment of The O.C.Due to a combination of low ratings and the death of Marissa in season three, it was rumored that the show would not return for a fifth season. In June 2006, Fox confirmed that "the current order for The O.C. is 16 episodes", but added that there was a chance to add more installments. In September 2006, Rachel Bilson said that she felt "like the show is over", and co-star Kelly Rowan stated that many of the cast realized the show was close to being cancelled. Rowan said that "when [the fourth season] was picked up for just 16 episodes this year the cast had a feeling the end was near".
On January 3, 2007, Fox announced that The O.C. was to be cancelled. In a statement, Schwartz said "This feels like the best time to bring the show to its close" adding that "what better time to go out than creatively on top". A campaign was launched to save the show and over half a million people signed an official petition at www.fox.com/oc/savetheoc. There were rumors that the show would be saved, and a move to The CW was mooted; however, The CW president Dawn Ostroff, whose company is partly owned by Warner Bros, confirmed in January 2007 that while the move was discussed, it was decided against.

Schwartz said that the cancellation of the show "was really creatively liberating, not worrying about ratings." Belinda Acosta of The Austin Chronicle agreed praising the show's "new energy" and its ability to successfully cover "the transition between high school and college that other series have stumbled over". Entertainment Weekly's Ken Tucker commented that the fourth season was "a succession of terrific subplots" and praised new main cast member Taylor "as a fine, funny love interest for Ryan". Greg Elwell of DVD Talk'' described Bullit as "the breakout character of the season" but commented that the seasons "dark opening (...) didn't do much to keep viewers around". IGN's Eric Goldman was also critical saying that "as amusing as Che was, his inclusion into some later episodes gets a bit tired". Goldman also commented that "the second half of Season 4 wasn't quite as solid as the first [half]"; however, he added that while the fourth season had to prove itself again as an enjoyable watch "Josh Schwartz rose to this challenge (...) once again creating a show that was witty and self-aware".

DVD release
The DVD release of season four was released by Warner Bros. in the US on 22 May 2007 after it had completed broadcast on television. As well as every episode from the season, the DVD release features bonus material including unaired scenes, featurettes, and audio commentary on the series finale.

References

General
 
Specific

External links
 Episode guide at Warner Bros.' The OC Insider
 

Season 4
2006 American television seasons
2007 American television seasons